Miguel Descartes Batista Jerez (born February 19, 1971) is a Dominican former professional baseball pitcher. He played in Major League Baseball for the Pittsburgh Pirates, Florida Marlins, Chicago Cubs, Montreal Expos, Kansas City Royals, Arizona Diamondbacks, Toronto Blue Jays, Seattle Mariners, Washington Nationals,  St. Louis Cardinals, New York Mets and Atlanta Braves.

Baseball career

Arizona Diamondbacks
Over his career, Batista played for eight teams and was utilized extensively as a starter and a reliever. He pitched  shutout innings at Yankee Stadium in Game 5 of the 2001 World Series. He faced one batter in game seven of the 2001 World Series, getting the second out of the eighth inning before Randy Johnson finished the game.

Toronto Blue Jays
He signed a three-year $13.1-million contract with the Toronto Blue Jays prior to the  season, but struggled in his first season with his new club, posting a 4.80 ERA and losing his starter's job late in the season. In , Batista was the Jays closer and blew 8 saves. He was put on the trading block after the Blue Jays signed B. J. Ryan to a large contract to be their new closer. They traded Batista back to the Diamondbacks during the 2005 offseason along with Orlando Hudson for Troy Glaus and prospect Sergio Santos. Batista's  record in Arizona was 11–8 with an ERA of 4.58.

Seattle Mariners
After the season, the Diamondbacks offered Batista arbitration, as he was a free agent, but Arizona was not willing to commit to a multi-year deal; in December, Batista signed a three-year contract with the Seattle Mariners worth $24 million. Batista had a solid first season with the Mariners, going 16–11 with a 4.29 ERA.   During the offseason Batista pitches for the Aguilas Cibaeñas of the Dominican Winter League

During 2008, he had the lowest percentage of quality starts in the majors, at 25%, and the fewest innings pitched per start, at 4.6.  He threw strikes in 57% of his pitches, the lowest rate in the majors. In 2009, he was moved to a long relief role in the bullpen.

On November 6, 2009, Batista declared free agency.

On September 2, Batista was nominated for the Roberto Clemente Award. He was nominated because in the off-season he traveled throughout the United States and Latin America to deliver baseball equipment, medical supplies, and speak to kids of all ages to stress the importance of education and determination. Batista said this about being nominated for helping the less fortunate:

Washington Nationals
On January 29, 2010, Batista agreed to a minor league contract with the Washington Nationals with an invite to spring training. On July 27, 2010, Batista was called on to replace the injured Stephen Strasburg ten minutes before game time. Batista threw 5 shutout innings, allowing 3 hits and recording 6 strikeouts. Following the game, in which he was booed twice for replacing much-touted Stephen Strasburg, Batista told reporters, "Imagine, if you go there to see Miss Universe — and you end up having Miss Iowa." When Miss Iowa USA Katherine Connors heard about the comment, she replied in a statement, "I know I can throw a pitch or two! The question is, can Miguel Batista walk the runway in a swimsuit?" Batista sent her flowers and she was invited to throw a ceremonial pitch at Nationals Park on 30 July 2010. He later clarified his statement by saying, "People started booing me, and they hadn't seen me throw a pitch yet. It's like you hear 'Miss Iowa,' and you say, 'Iowa?' And then you see her up close and you say, 'Wow, she's gorgeous.'" Batista was invited to judge the 2011 Miss Iowa USA competition.
Batista finished the season with a 3.87 ERA and became a free agent.

St. Louis Cardinals
The St. Louis Cardinals announced Miguel Batista signed a minor league deal on January 14, 2011. In a spring training game, Batista hit Nationals shortstop Ian Desmond on the back. Later, when asked if the pitch hurt, Desmond replied, "Miggy throws like Miss Iowa. No big deal."

Batista made the opening day roster out of spring training.

On Friday, April 22, with imminent severe weather moving into the area in the area and the increasingly likely threat of a rain delay at first pitch, the Cardinals opted to switch their starting pitcher for the game – calling on Batista to make his first start of the season in favor of scheduled starter Kyle McClellan.  The rain began falling at the start of the game as predicted and the umpire crew opted for a rain delay.  Two hours later the Cardinals were able to send their scheduled starter McClellan back to the mound while the opposing Cincinnati Reds had lost their starter.

The next day, this time after a 42-minute rain delay, the Cardinals again called on Batista – this time in relief in the 8th inning.  After getting Ryan Hanigan to make the first out Batista ran into trouble.  An error from third baseman David Freese put a man on 2nd with only one out.  After striking out Brandon Phillips and intentionally walking Joey Votto, Batista hit Jonny Gomes with an 0–2 count to load the bases.  He was then lifted in favor of lefty Trever Miller who would force home a run with a bases-loaded walk.  Miller yielded to ex-closer Ryan Franklin who allowed a single by Miguel Cairo to plate two more runs and put Batista on the hook for the loss.  Despite taking the loss, according to the commentators, Batista became the first pitcher since 2005 to start in a game and then relieve in the next game.

He was released on June 22, after recording a 4.90 ERA in  innings.

New York Mets
Batista signed a minor league contract with the New York Mets on July 4, 2011. On August 28, 2011, the Mets selected his contract from Buffalo. He made his first start with the Mets on September 1, 2011, and won his 100th career game. On September 28, 2011, the New York Mets' final game of the season, Batista started against the Cincinnati Reds and pitched a two-hit, complete-game shutout.

On January 10, 2012, Batista resigned with the Mets to a minor league deal. He was later added to the 40-man roster. After posting a 1–3 record with a 4.82 ERA, Batista was designated for assignment on July 22. He was released on July 26.

Atlanta Braves and later career
On July 27, 2012, Batista signed a contract with the Atlanta Braves. On January 19, 2013, Batista signed a minor league contract with the Colorado Rockies. He was released on March 25.

On April 9, 2013, Batista signed a minor league contract with the Toronto Blue Jays, and was assigned to the Triple-A Buffalo Bisons. He was released by the Blue Jays on May 21.

Writing career
Aside from being a baseball player, Batista is known for his love of poetry and philosophy, and he has written a book of poetry in Spanish titled Sentimientos en Blanco y Negro ("Feelings in Black and White"). Batista has also published Through the Eyes of the Law, a thriller about a serial killer. The novel was released on September 12, 2006, in the United States, and met with mixed reviews. It was released on January 25, 2006, in Santo Domingo, Dominican Republic and on February 10, 2006, in San Juan, Puerto Rico, where it has had some success.

References

External links

miguelbatista.net/

1971 births
Living people
Águilas Cibaeñas players
Arizona Diamondbacks players
Atlanta Braves players
Binghamton Mets players
Buffalo Bisons (minor league) players
Charlotte Knights players
Chicago Cubs players
Dominican Republic expatriate baseball players in Canada
Dominican Republic expatriate baseball players in the United States
Florida Marlins players
Gulf Coast Expos players
Gwinnett Braves players
Harrisburg Senators players
Iowa Cubs players
Kansas City Royals players
Major League Baseball pitchers
Major League Baseball players from the Dominican Republic
Montreal Expos players
New York Mets players
Omaha Golden Spikes players
Ottawa Lynx players
Pittsburgh Pirates players
Rockford Expos players
Seattle Mariners players
Sportspeople from Santo Domingo
St. Louis Cardinals players
Toronto Blue Jays players
Washington Nationals players
West Palm Beach Expos players
World Baseball Classic players of the Dominican Republic
2006 World Baseball Classic players